The 2016–17 Mississippi State Bulldogs women's basketball team represented Mississippi State University during the 2016–17 NCAA Division I women's basketball season. The Bulldogs, led by fifth year head coach Vic Schaefer. They played their home games at Humphrey Coliseum and are members of the Southeastern Conference.

The Bulldogs finished regular season play at 27–3, 13–3 in the SEC, before continuing into the post-season. They advanced to the finals of their conference tournament as the #2 seed, but lost to #1 seed South Carolina. They entered the NCAA Tournament as a #2 seed in the Oklahoma City regional. They beat the #3 seed Washington Huskies team in the regional semifinals to advance to the regional final against #1 seed Baylor. The Bulldogs won in overtime to clinch their first Final Four berth. This victory earned them the distinction of playing an undefeated UConn Huskies team, holder of a 111-game winning streak extending over three seasons. By upsetting the Huskies 66-64 in overtime on a buzzer-beating jumper by Morgan William, they advanced to play South Carolina in the 2017 NCAA Division I Women's Basketball Championship Game for the national title, which they lost.

Roster

Schedule

|-
!colspan=9 style="background:#660000; color:#FFFFFF;"| Exhibition

|-
!colspan=9 style="background:#660000; color:#FFFFFF;"| Non-conference regular season

|-
!colspan=9 style="background:#660000; color:#FFFFFF;"| SEC regular season

|-
!colspan=9 style="background:#660000; color:#FFFFFF;"| SEC Women's Tournament

|-
!colspan=9 style="background:#660000; color:#FFFFFF;"| NCAA Women's Tournament

Source:

Rankings

See also
 2016–17 Mississippi State Bulldogs men's basketball team

References

Mississippi State Bulldogs women's basketball seasons
Mississippi State
2016 in sports in Mississippi
2017 in sports in Mississippi
Mississippi State
NCAA Division I women's basketball tournament Final Four seasons